For the 2009–10 season, Carlisle United F.C. competed in Football League One.

First team squad 
Players ages are as of 1 August 2009

Competitions

League One

League table

Results

FA Cup

League Cup

Football League Trophy

References

Carlisle United F.C. seasons
Carlisle United